Tina Ann Davidson (born 1960) is a retired rear admiral in the United States Navy, and Commander, of Navy Medicine Education, Training and Logistics Command, from 2018 to 2020. She is a fellow in the American College of Healthcare Executives (FACHE).

Raised in St. Louis, Missouri, Davidson graduated from Benedictine College with a B.A. degree in biology and from St. Louis University with a B.S. degree in nursing. She later earned an M.S. degree in nursing from The Catholic University of America and an M.A. degree in health services management from Webster University. Davidson also holds a doctorate in nursing practice from Rush University.

In 2017, she held a town hall. In 2020, she retired.

References

External links

1960 births
Living people
Place of birth missing (living people)
People from St. Louis
Benedictine College alumni
Saint Louis University alumni
American military nurses
Catholic University of America alumni
Webster University alumni
Rush University alumni
Recipients of the Meritorious Service Medal (United States)
Recipients of the Legion of Merit
United States Navy admirals
Female admirals of the United States Navy
21st-century American women